Natalie or Nathaly is a feminine given name of English and French origin, derived from the Latin phrase natale domini, meaning "birth of the Lord". Further alternative spellings of the name include Nathalie, Natalee, and Natalia/Natalija.

Notable people named Natalie 
 Natalie of Serbia (1859–1941), Queen of Serbia
 Natalie Albino (born 1984), member of the R&B duo Nina Sky
 Natalie Alvarado (commonly referred to as "Natalie") (born 1979), American R&B singer and songwriter
 Natalie Anderson (born 1981), English actress model
 Natalie Angier (born 1958), American science writer
 Natalie Appleton (born 1973), English-Canadian singer-songwriter and former member of the groups All Saints and Appleton
 Natalie Bassingthwaighte (born 1975), Australian Hollywood actress and former singer for pop group the Rogue Traders
 Natalie Bevan (1909–2007), British artist and art collector
 Natalie Blair (born 1984), Australian soap actress
 Natalie Brown (singer) (born 1978), Canadian pop and blue-eyed soul singer-songwriter
 Natalie Brown (actress) (born 1973), Canadian actress known for her role in Sophie
 Natalie Cassidy (born 1983), English actress
 Natalie Chou (born 1997), American basketball player
 Natalie Clein (born 1977), British classical cellist
 Natalie Clifford Barney (1876–1972), American writer and salon hostess
 Natalie Cohen (born 1989), birth name of Madame Mayhem, American singer-songwriter and recording artist
 Natalie Cole (1950–2015), American singer, voice actress, songwriter, and actress
 Natalie Cook (born 1975), Australian professional beach volleyball player and Olympic gold medallist
 Natalie Coughlin (born 1982), American competition swimmer and twelve-time Olympic medalist
 Natalie Denise Suleman (born 1975), American mother of octuplets (also known as Nadya Suleman)
 Natalie Depraz (born 1964), French philosopher
 Natalie Dessay (born 1965), French singer, actress, and former operatic soprano
 Natalie Desselle-Reid (1967–2020), American actress
 Natalie Don ( 2020s), Scottish politician
 Natalie Dormer (born 1982), English actress
 Natalie du Toit (born 1984), South African swimmer and Paralympic medallist
 Natalie Edwards (born 1978), American treasury official and whistleblower
 Natalie Glebova (born 1981), Russian-Canadian television host, author, dancer, model, and Miss Universe 2005
 Natalie Gnehm (born 1991), Thai model
 Natalie Goldberg (born 1948), American popular author and speaker
 Natalie Grams (born 1978), German physician and author
 Natalie Grant (born 1971), contemporary Christian music singer-songwriter
 Natalie Griesbeck (born 1956), French politician
 Natalie Grinham (born 1978), Australian squash player
 Natalie Gulbis (born 1983), American professional golfer
 Natalie Gumede (born 1984), English actress
 Natalie Horler (born 1981), lead singer of Cascada
 Natalie Imbruglia (born 1975), Australian pop singer and soap actress
 Natalie Jeremijenko (born 1966), Australian artist and engineer
 Natalie Kalmus (1878–1965), American Technicolor color specialist
 Natalie MacMaster (born 1972), Canadian fiddler
 Natalie Maines (born 1974), lead singer for the Dixie Chicks
 Natalie Mars (born 1984), American pornographic actress
 Natalie McGarry (born 1981, Scottish Member of Parliament
 Natalie Merchant (born 1963), American musician, former lead singer for 10,000 Maniacs
 Natalie Morales (born 1972), American journalist
 Natalie Morales (born 1985), American TV actress
 Natalie Munt (born 1977), English Olympic badminton player
 Natalie Nakase (born 1980), American professional basketball coach
 Nethalie Nanayakkara (born 1936), Sri Lankan Sinhala cinema, TV, and theater actress
 Natalie "Nattie" Neidhart (born 1982), Canadian-American professional WWE wrestler
 Natalie Nougayrède (born 1966), French journalist
 Natalie Nunn (born 1984), American reality TV personality
 Natalie Palamides (born 1990), American actress
 Natalie Pike (born 1983), English model and presenter for Manchester City FC
 Natalie Portman (born 1981), American-Israeli actress and filmmaker
 Natalie Powell (born 1990), Welsh judoka 
 Natalie Raitano (born 1966), American actress
 Natalie Saleeba (born 1978), Australian-Lebanese actress
 Natalie Schafer (1900–1991), American actress known for Gilligan's Island
 Natalie Shiyanova (born 1979), Russian actress
 Natalie Sleeth (1930–1992), American pianist and choral composer
 Natalie So (born 1996), Hong Kong singer
 Natalie Talmadge (1896-1969), American silent film actress
 Natalie Tong (born 1981), Hong Kong actress and model
 Natalie Tyler Tran (born 1986), Australian online producer, actress, and comedian
 Natalie Walker, American singer and musician, former member of Daughter Darling
 Natalie White (born 1983), American former reality TV personality
 Natalie Wong (born 1976), Hong Kong actress
 Natalie Wood (1938–1981), American actress
 Natalie Wynn (born 1988), American YouTuber
 Natalie Zemon Davis (born 1928), Canadian-American early modern historian

Notable people named Nathaly 

 Nathaly Kurata, Brazilian tennis player
 Nathaly Navas, Venezuelan model and pageant titleholder
 Nathaly Silva, American–Nicaraguan footballer

See also
 Natali (name)
 Natalee
 Nathalie
 Natalya
 Natalia
 Natasha
 Natacha
 Natasja
 Natty

Notes

English feminine given names
Scottish feminine given names
German feminine given names
Dutch feminine given names
Norwegian feminine given names
Swedish feminine given names
Danish feminine given names
Hebrew feminine given names
Latin feminine given names
French feminine given names
Feminine given names